La Manga, or La Manga del Mar Menor (meaning "The Sandbar of the Minor Sea") is a seaside spit of Mar Menor in the Region of Murcia, Spain.

The strip is 21 km long and 100 metres wide (average), separating the Mediterranean Sea from the Mar Menor (Minor Sea) lagoon, from Cabo de Palos to the Punta del Mojón.
 

 
Historically, it was known by the Romans as Palus and later  by the Moors as Al Buhayrat Al Qsarand. In the 17th century  its name changed to Mar Chico, meaning "small sea" and later as El Mar Menor. Originally, it was a bay opening into the Mediterranean; at either end, volcanic reefs gradually held back the sand and sediment that was dragged along by the sea currents to form a sandy column of dunes and rock vegetation and long beaches in contact with two seas. La Manga sandbar is cut off by natural channels that keep the two seas in contact with each other; the so-called golas allow water from the Mediterranean into the lake. As such, the space was untouched until the 1960s, when La Manga was discovered as a tourist resort and underwent a transformation which included the urbanisation of the area and the construction of tourist infrastructures.

In 1938, during the Spanish Civil War, the Battle of Cape Palos took place near the cape. 
Its lighthouse began operating on January 31, 1865. The cape is part of a marine reserve, the Reserva Marina de Cabo de Palos e Islas Hormigas.

The nearest airport Región de Murcia International Airport is located just over 50 kilometres by road.

Sports 
The Mar Menor  with its 5 islands and having shallow and protected waters, lends itself to being an International  waterbased Sports Station.

There are sailing and skiing schools that run periodical courses, as well as windsurfing and catamarans, and canoeing.  In the nearby town  of Los Belones  is a stadium, La Manga Stadium, known for hosting numerous football clubs from all over the world during the winter months. La Manga Cup at La Manga Club has been staged every year since 1999. The 2011, 2012, and 2013 Copa del Sol tournaments were also held partly at the stadium, as well as many of the 2000–01 Nordic Football Championship matches.

 Panoramic view La Manga del Mar Menor

External links

 Official Tourism website of Murcia
  Unofficial La Manga del Mar Menor Tourism Guide
  AreaLaManga.net Portal guide of la manga mar menor. MURCIA Spain
 La Manga Activities
 Map - Link to google maps

Cartagena, Spain

Landforms of the Region of Murcia
Landforms of Spain

Spits of Europe